The 2016 Las Vegas Bowl was a college football bowl game that was played on December 17, 2016, at Sam Boyd Stadium in Whitney, Nevada. The twenty-fifth annual Las Vegas Bowl is one of the 2016–17 bowl games that concludes the 2016 FBS football season. The game aired on ABC. Previously sponsored by lubricant manufacturer Royal Purple, the sponsorship ended in 2015, with the name of the bowl game reverting to the official name of the Las Vegas Bowl.

Team selection
The game would have featured teams from the Mountain West Conference and Pac-12 Conference. However, since the Pac-12 had only six bowl-eligible teams, and two of them qualified for New Years Six bowls, the sixth-place Pac-12 team was unavailable. Instead, the bowl elected to invite the Houston Cougars of the American Athletic Conference. This was the first time an AAC team played in the Las Vegas Bowl. The representative from the Mountain West was San Diego State, which qualified for the bowl by winning the 2016 Mountain West Conference Football Championship Game. Houston played in its first-ever Las Vegas Bowl, while San Diego State appeared for a second time, the first being a 1998 loss to North Carolina.

This was the third meeting between the schools, with Houston having won both previous ones.  The most recent prior meeting was on October 6, 1973, when the Cougars defeated the Aztecs by a score of 14–9.

Houston

San Diego State

Game summary
On the fourth drive of the game, Houston capped a 10-play, 24-yard drive with a 31-yard field goal by Ty Cummings. After a three-and-out by San Diego State, Houston went on a 10-play, 74-yard touchdown drive. Greg Ward, Jr.'s 2-yard run put the Cougars up 10–0 to finish the 1st quarter.  San Diego State responded with 34 unanswered points, leading to a 34–10 win by the Aztecs.

On the first play of the Aztecs' first drive in the 4th quarter, Donnel Pumphrey broke the all-time FBS career record for rushing yardage.

Scoring summary

Source:

Statistics

References

2016–17 NCAA football bowl games
2016
2016 Las Vegas Bowl
2016 Las Vegas Bowl
2016 in sports in Nevada
December 2016 sports events in the United States